Zimbabwe Telegraph is an internet newspaper published in Zimbabwe, UK and Canada. It has a specialised focus on current events in Zimbabwe's politics, social and economic developments. The newspaper was first published in late 2008.

The Zimbabwe Telegraphs website is an aggregated news and opinion articles. The site covers a wide range of topics, including sections devoted to politics, entertainment, media, health, law and business. Its team of regular bloggers include many people from Zimbabwe's politicians, commentators, and analysts to an extensive network of opinion writers.

History
Zimbabwe Telegraph began publication on 16 December 2008 by 3MG Media as a news and current events publication focused on Zimbabwe social, political and economic developments.  3MG Media also publishes the Zimbabwe Daily News (ZimDaily), Zimbabwe Tribune and Harare Tribune.

Contributors
In addition to regular (often daily) news by its reporters and a regular team of contributors the Zimbabwe Telegraph has featured notable contributors from finance, politics, journalism, business, and entertainment. The Zimbabwe Telegraph offers both news commentary and coverage. It has a standing policy of encouraging comments from all parts of the political spectrum through its forum website co-hosted with its sister publication Zimbabwe Daily News. The forum is home to discussions on politics, religion, and world affairs.

Circulation
Zimbabwe Telegraphs print edition's circulation has been put on hold due to the economic conditions in Zimbabwe. However, its website is updated daily and accessible for free since December 2008.

External links
http://www.zimTelegraph.com
 https://web.archive.org/web/20090612111407/http://www.swradioafrica.com:80/news090609/mutambara090609.htm

Newspapers published in Zimbabwe